Hanne Mestdagh (born 19 April 1993) is a Belgian basketball player for BC Namur-Capitale and the Belgian national team.

She participated at the EuroBasket Women 2017.

Colorado State statistics 

Source

References

External links
 
 Hanne Mestdagh at Eurobasket.com
 Hanne Mestdagh at Colorado State
 
 
 

1993 births
Living people
Belgian women's basketball players
Olympic basketball players of Belgium
Basketball players at the 2020 Summer Olympics
Belgian expatriate basketball people in Germany
Belgian expatriate basketball people in the United States
Colorado State Rams women's basketball players
Small forwards
Sportspeople from Ypres